Tea Tree Plaza Interchange (previously known as Modbury Interchange) is a bus interchange operated by Adelaide Metro in Modbury, South Australia as part of the O-Bahn Busway. It is a central public transport hub for the north eastern suburbs of Adelaide.

History
Tea Tree Plaza Interchange was built as the terminating station of Stage 2 of the O-Bahn Busway from Paradise Interchange. It was opened on 20 August 1989 by Premier John Bannon. Originally named Modbury Interchange, it was renamed Tea Tree Plaza Interchange on 12 September 1997.

2013 Redevelopments
On 24 February 2013, Premier Jay Weatherill announced a $17 million upgrade of facilities along the O-Bahn Busway, which included increased bicycle storage, real-time information screens and additional seating.  As part of the upgrade, a $14 million multiple level carpark was built on the north-west corner of the Tea Tree Gully campus of TAFE SA. The carpark provides 700 spaces, 300 more than was previously available. The entrance to the carpark utilises the access road from Smart Road that was previously only used by buses entering the busway. The development is expected to meet consumer demand at the interchange until 2021. The carpark opened on 13 January 2014. However some have criticised the move to charge non-Metrocard holders $10, whereas those whose who have a metrocard are only charged $2.

Nearby locations
The Westfield Tea Tree Plaza shopping centre and two others are very close by with parking available in those car parks, making it a popular interchange for city-goers and shoppers of the area. The interchange is also a popular hangout for students from the nearby Modbury South Primary School, The Heights School and Modbury High School, and the Ardtornish Primary School. The terminal is serviced by Schoolbus M and Schoolbus X in the mornings and Schoolbus E and Schoolbus P in the afternoons.

The interchange is approximately 10 minutes from the Golden Grove Interchange, approximately 20 minutes from the Greenwith Community Centre and approximately 10–15 minutes away from the Currie Street bus stop.

Other stations that service the O-Bahn include Paradise Interchange and Klemzig Interchange.

Bus routes

References

Adelaide O-Bahn
Bus stations in Australia
Transport infrastructure completed in 1989
Transport buildings and structures in South Australia